Putting it Together is a musical revue showcasing the songs of Stephen Sondheim.  Drawing its title from a song in Sunday in the Park with George, it was devised by Sondheim and Julia McKenzie. The revue has received several productions, beginning with its premiere in England in 1992, Broadway in 1999 and the West End in 2014.

Production history

Original UK production (1992)
The revue came about due to many requests for an update to Side by Side by Sondheim (1976). Having resisted a new show, he was finally convinced by producer Cameron Mackintosh, and Julia McKenzie was brought in to assist.

Putting It Together was first performed on January 27, 1992 at the Old Fire Station Theatre in Oxford, England, where it ran for 24 performances. Directed by Julia McKenzie and produced by Cameron Mackintosh, the cast included Diana Rigg, Clive Carter, Claire Moore, Clarke Peters, and Kit Hesketh-Harvey.

Original US production (1993)
The Manhattan Theatre Club production opened Off-Broadway on April 1, 1993 at New York City Center, where it ran for 59 performances and 37 previews. It was directed by McKenzie and choreographed by Bob Avian, with scenery by Robin Wagner, costumes by Theoni V. Aldredge, and lighting by Tharon Musser.  The cast included Stephen Collins, Christopher Durang, Michael Rupert, Rachel York, and Julie Andrews, making her return to the New York City stage after an absence of more than 30 years.

The markedly revised revue now had a slight plot:  At an all-night, black-tie party in a penthouse. The hosts, an older couple (Andrews and Collins) face their disillusions and marital troubles; a younger, less jaundiced couple (Rupert and York) struggle with their feelings and desires, and a commentator (Durang) oversees and influences the action.  The spouses deal with infidelity and divorce but finally reconcile before dawn.  A cast recording was released by RCA Records.

Broadway production (1999)
A production at the Mark Taper Forum (Los Angeles) transferred to Broadway the following year, opening November 21, 1999 at the Ethel Barrymore Theatre, where it ran for 101 performances and 22 previews.  Directed by Eric D. Schaeffer and choreographed by Bob Avian, the Broadway cast included Carol Burnett (Wife), George Hearn (Husband), Ruthie Henshall (Young Woman), John Barrowman (Young Man), and Bronson Pinchot (Observer).  Kathie Lee Gifford replaced Burnett at some performances.  The production marked the return of Burnett to the Broadway stage after performing in Moon Over Buffalo in 1995.  Hearn was nominated for the Tony Award for Best Actor in a Musical.

A video recording of the Broadway production (directed by Don Roy King) was released for television and home media as Putting It Together: Direct from Broadway. The DVD release includes blooper footage of Burnett's skirt falling down during the opening of the second act.

West End production (2014)
The revue received its West End premiere in January 2014 at St. James Theatre, London with a cast that included Janie Dee, David Bedella, Damian Humbley, Caroline Sheen, and Daniel Crossley. It was directed by Alastair Knights, with choreography by Matthew Rowland and Musical Supervision by Alex Parker. It ran for a strictly limited 3-week run, closing on the 1st February 2014.

Original Ireland production (2015)
The revue received its Irish premiere in December 2015 at Lyric Theatre, Belfast with Fra Fee, Carol Starks, Nicholas Pound, Christina Tedders, and Brad Clapson, directed by Stephen Whitson, and musical supervision by Alex Parker.

Songs

Original production

Act I
Invocation and Instructions (The Frogs)
Putting It Together (Sunday in the Park with George)
Rich and Happy (Merrily We Roll Along)
Merrily We Roll Along (Merrily We Roll Along)
Lovely (A Funny Thing Happened on the Way to the Forum)
Everybody Ought to Have a Maid (A Funny Thing Happened on the Way to the Forum)
Sequence: 
Sooner or Later (Dick Tracy)
I'm Calm (A Funny Thing Happened on the Way to the Forum)
Impossible (A Funny Thing Happened on the Way to the Forum) 
Ah, But Underneath ...! (Follies - London)
Hello Little Girl (Into the Woods)
My Husband the Pig/ Every Day a Little Death (A Little Night Music)
Have I Got a Girl for You (Company)
Pretty Women (Sweeney Todd)
Now (A Little Night Music)
Bang! (A Little Night Music)
Country House (Follies - London)
Could I Leave You? (Follies)

Act II
Entr'acte/ Back in Business (Dick Tracy) 
Rich and Happy (Merrily We Roll Along)
Night Waltzes (A Little Night Music-stage and film) 
Gun Song (Assassins)
The Miller's Son (A Little Night Music) 
Live Alone and Like It (Dick Tracy)
Sorry-Grateful (Company)
Sweet Polly Plunkett (Sweeney Todd)
I Could Drive a Person Crazy (Company) 
Marry Me a Little (Company) 
Getting Married Today (Company) 
Being Alive (Company)
Like It Was (Merrily We Roll Along) 
Old Friends (Merrily We Roll Along)

Broadway production (1999)

Act I
Invocation and Instructions to the Audience (from The Frogs) — The Observer
Putting It Together (from Sunday in the Park with George) —The Company
Rich and Happy (from Merrily We Roll Along) — The Company
Do I Hear a Waltz? (from Do I Hear a Waltz?) — The Wife, The Husband
Merrily We Roll Along #1 (from Merrily We Roll Along) — The Observer
Lovely (from A Funny Thing Happened on the Way to the Forum) — The Younger Woman, The Wife
Hello Little Girl (from Into the Woods) — The Husband, The Younger Woman
My Husband the Pig (from A Little Night Music) — The Wife
Everyday a Little Death (from A Little Night Music) — The Wife, The Younger Woman
Everybody Ought to Have a Maid (from A Funny Thing Happened On The Way to the Forum) — The Wife, The Observer
Have I Got a Girl for You (from Company) — The Younger Man, The Husband
Pretty Women (from Sweeney Todd) — The Younger Man, The Husband
Sooner or Later (from Dick Tracy) — The Younger Woman
Bang! (from A Little Night Music) — The Younger Man, The Observer, The Younger Woman
Country House (from Follies) — The Wife, The Husband
Unworthy of Your Love (from Assassins) — The Younger Man, The Younger Woman
Merrily We Roll Along #2 (from Merrily We Roll Along) — The Observer
Could I Leave You? (from Follies) — The Wife
Rich and Happy (Reprise) — The Company

Act II
Back in Business (from Dick Tracy) — The Company
It's Hot Up Here (from Sunday in the Park with George) — The Company
The Ladies Who Lunch (from Company) — The Wife
The Road You Didn't Take (from Follies) — The Husband
Live Alone and Like It (from Dick Tracy) — The Younger Man
More (from Dick Tracy) — The Younger Woman
There's Always a Woman (from Anyone Can Whistle) — The Wife, The Younger Woman
Buddy's Blues (from Follies) — The Observer
Good Thing Going (from Merrily We Roll Along) — The Husband
Marry Me a Little ( from Company) — The Younger Man
Not Getting Married Today (from Company) — The Wife
Merrily We Roll Along #3 (from Merrily We Roll Along) — The Company
Being Alive (from Company) — The Company
Like It Was (from Merrily We Roll Along) — The Wife
Old Friends (from Merrily We Roll Along) — The Company

Awards and nominations

Original Broadway production

References

External links 

Putting It Together on The Stephen Sondheim Reference Guide
Putting it Together (1999 Broadway version), Music Theatre International
Curtain Up review (1999 production)
Talkin' Broadway review (1999 production)

1992 musicals
Broadway musicals
Off-Broadway musicals
Revues
Musicals by Stephen Sondheim